William Aaron Champlin was a member of the Mississippi House of Representatives, representing Harrison County, from 1874 to 1875.

Biography 
William Aaron Champlin was originally from North Stonington, Connecticut. He moved to Harrison County, Mississippi, after the Civil War, and served as its first probate clerk. From 1874 to 1875, he was a member of the Mississippi House of Representatives, representing Harrison County.

Personal life 
Champlin was married to Margaret Smith, who was born in Liverpool, England. Their son, Zachary Taylor Champlin, served in the Mississippi State Senate from 1918 to 1920.

References 

Members of the Mississippi House of Representatives
19th-century American politicians
Year of birth missing
Year of death missing
People from North Stonington, Connecticut
People from Harrison County, Mississippi